The Beautiful and the Damned may refer to:

The Beautiful and Damned,  F. Scott Fitzgerald's second novel
The Beautiful and Damned (film), a 1922 silent film, adapted from the novel
Beautiful and Damned, a 2004 British stage musical about Fitzgerald and his wife, Zelda
The Beautiful & Damned (album), 2017 album by G-Eazy
The Beautiful and the Damned (album), 2002 album by Lash
The Beautiful and the Damned: A Portrait of the New India, a non-fiction work by Siddhartha Deb